Road 84 is a road in southeastern Iran. It is the most important transit road in that area of Iran. It connects Pakistan to Kerman and Tehran Road 71.

Gallery

References

External links 

 Iran road map on Young Journalists Club

Roads in Iran